The Duoliang Station is a former railway station in Duoliang Village, Taimali Township, Taitung County, Taiwan. It has become a popular tourist attraction, with the platform turned into an observation deck overlooking the rail track and the Pacific coastline.

History
The station was inaugurated in October 1992. On 1 October 2006 the station was closed due to low passenger traffic. After that, the roads connecting the platform were removed. On 31 March 2019, the station was closed for upgrading works. The local government made a small renovation work at the former station building where they expanded the observation deck above the tracks. On 1 February 2021, the station began charging visitors entrance fee to the station which is used as cleaning fee.

Transportation
The station is located along and parallel with Provincial Highway 9.

See also
 List of tourist attractions in Taiwan

References

1992 establishments in Taiwan
2006 disestablishments in Taiwan
Buildings and structures in Taitung County
Defunct railway stations in Taiwan
Railway stations opened in 1992
Railway stations closed in 2006
Tourist attractions in Taitung County